The Mitragliatrice Breda calibro 8 modello 38 per carri armati was an Italian tank-pattern machine gun used in the Second World War on the Fiat L6/40, the Fiat M11/39 and the Fiat M13/40. It was also adapted as infantry machine gun. The M38 is based upon the Breda M37. The Breda 38 received the German identification code Kampfwagen-Maschinengewehr 350(i).

Development

The Italians have also adapted it for use as an infantry machine gun. For this purpose the gun is mounted on a machine-gun tripod...by means of an adapter, and is fitted with a temporary rear sight on the right of the body and a temporary front sight on the right of the barrel at the muzzle. These temporary open sights take the place of the optical sight used when the gun is tank-mounted.

Design details
The gun is air-cooled, gas-operated, and magazine-fed, and has a quick-change barrel. Its operational features are simple, and it is extremely easy to field-strip or disassemble completely. The barrel is sufficiently heavy (4,5 kg) to enable it to fire a large number of rounds in quick succession without overheating.

References

External links

 Breda Model 38 Variant

8×59mm RB Breda machine guns
Breda weapons
Gas-operated firearms
Tank guns
World War II infantry weapons of Italy
World War II machine guns
Weapons and ammunition introduced in 1938